FC Lada-Tolyatti is a Russian football club based in Tolyatti.

History
The club was founded in 1970 at the VAZ automobile company under the name of Torpedo. The team played in the Soviet Second League until the dissolution of USSR. In 1988 the club was renamed after VAZ's Lada brand.

Since entering the Russian First Division in 1992 Lada experienced a number of divisional movements. They played in the Top Division in 1994 and 1996, in the First Division in 1992–1993, 1995, 1997–1998, 2000–2003 and 2006, and in the Second Division in 1999 and 2004–2005. Both spells in the Top Division were unsuccessful, as Lada finished last. Lada reached the semifinal of the Russian Cup in 2002/03. Lada Togliatti failed to obtain the First Division licence and were thus relegated to Second Division in 2007.

The club dropped out of professional competition once again before the 2022–23 season, due to lack of financing.

Reserve squad 
Lada's reserve squad played professionally as FC Lada-d Togliatti in the Russian Third League in 1995.

Notable players 
Had international caps for their respective countries. Players whose name is listed in bold represented their countries while playing for Lada.

  Vasili Zhupikov
  Maksim Buznikin
  Maksim Demenko
  Yevgeni Kharlachyov
   Aleksei Bakharev
  Barsegh Kirakosyan
  Alyaksandr Sulima
  Vaso Sepashvili
  Andrei Miroshnichenko
  Konstantin Pavlyuchenko
  Maksim Shevchenko
  Konstantīns Igošins
  Nerijus Barasa
  Rahmatullo Fuzailov
  Charyar Mukhadov
  Yevhen Drahunov
  Yuri Hudymenko
  Volodymyr Savchenko
  Aleksandr Khvostunov
  Andrei Rezantsev
  Gennadiy Sharipov
  Maksim Shatskikh
  Vladimir Shishelov

See also
 FC Academiya
 FC Togliatti
 Konoplyov football academy

References

External links
Official website 

Association football clubs established in 1970
Sport in Tolyatti
1970 establishments in Russia
 
Football clubs in Russia